Eupithecia tabacata is a moth in the family Geometridae. It was described by David Stephen Fletcher in 1951. It is found in Kenya.

References

Endemic moths of Kenya
Moths described in 1951
tabacata
Moths of Africa